Gerger, Azerbaijan may refer to:
Gərgər, Azerbaijan 
Qarqar, Azerbaijan